Dysrhythmia may refer to:

Circadian dysrhythmias, disturbances of circadian (daily) rhythms including jet lag and disturbed sleep timing
Cardiac dysrhythmia, a medical condition causing irregular heart rate, also called arrhythmia
Dysrhythmia (band), a progressive metal band from Brooklyn
Dizrythmia, a 1977 album by Split Enz